Çimen is a Turkish surname. Notable people with the surname include:

 Ali Cimen, Turkish journalist
 Daniyel Cimen, German footballer
 Derya Çimen, Turkish model
 Mazlum Çimen, Turkish musician
 Uğur Çimen, Turkish football coach

Turkish-language surnames